Marty McKenzie may refer to:

Marty McKenzie (rugby league), Australian rugby league player
Marty McKenzie (rugby union), Rugby union footballer